Kansas's 12th Senate district is one of 40 districts in the Kansas Senate. It has been represented by Republican Caryn Tyson since 2013.

Geography
District 12 covers Allen, Anderson, Franklin, and Linn Counties and parts of Bourbon and Miami Counties along the eastern edge of the state. Communities in the district include Ottawa, Iola, Osawatomie, Garnett, Humboldt, Wellsville, and Pleasanton.

The district is located entirely within Kansas's 2nd congressional district, and overlaps with the 2nd, 4th, 5th, 6th, 9th, and 59th districts of the Kansas House of Representatives. It borders the state of Missouri.

Recent election results

2020

2016

2012

Federal and statewide results in District 12

References

12
Allen County, Kansas
Anderson County, Kansas
Bourbon County, Kansas
Franklin County, Kansas
Linn County, Kansas
Miami County, Kansas